The Goulburn to Sydney  cycling race was a one-day road bicycle race. The first race was held in 1902 with the last in 2012.

History

The route from Goulburn to Sydney via the Hume Highway was popular with cyclists in the late 19th century and numerous record attempts were made for the journey finishing at the Sydney GPO. In 1896 the League of Wheelmen organised a race from Goulburn to Ashfield which was won by H Hayes. The fastest time was Arthur Graeme in 7 hours 59 minutes.

The Goulburn to Sydney became an annual event from 1902. The race was initially promoted by Dunlop Rubber who also promoted the Warrnambool to Melbourne Classic From 1902 until 1912 the fastest NSW rider was selected to appear for NSW in the Warrnambool to Melbourne Classic. The race was initially organised by the League of NSW Wheelmen for professional riders. Two races were held in 1906, on 22 September organised by the newly formed NSW Cyclists Association  and on 24 November by the League of NSW Wheelmen.

There were calls for an amateur event  however these did not come to fruition until 1913 when Dunlop Rubber cancelled the 1913 Goulburn classic. The NSW Cycling Union organised an amateur race as a selection race for the 1916 Summer Olympics.

The race was a handicap race from 1902 to 1993, with riders leaving Goulburn at different intervals. In 1945 the handicap system for the professional race changed to starting in three groups. The professional race was conducted as a massed start or a scratch race from 1951 to 1954  and 1970–1971, however the amateur event continued to be a handicap. From 1985 the professional and amateur races were replaced by a single open race. The open race was conducted as a handicap in 1985–1986 and 1988–1993. From 1994 the race was conducted as a scratch race.

Kerry Hoole set the fastest time on five occasions. Seven riders have set the fastest time on three occasions, Rodney Crowe, Fred Kerz, Richard Lamb, Robert Leach, Hubert Opperman, Ken Ross, Alfred Strom, Charles Winterbottom. No rider has won the event more than twice, with Richard Lamb, Kevin Massard, Hubert Opperman, Alf Overton, Mark Robinson, Eddy Salas, each achieving two wins.

In 1939 no race was held because the Police Department placed a ban on bicycle racing on main roads in NSW. The race was again banned by the police from 1948 to 1950 

In 2013 the teams insisted upon a full rolling road closure. The police would not approve a rolling road closure of the Hume Highway and would only approve a single lane rolling road closure, which was not acceptable to the teams. Alternate roads were considered however no agreement could be reached and the event was cancelled.

The Route
Historically, the route started in Goulburn in the Southern Highlands and followed what is now known as the Hume Highway to Sydney. There have been various changes to the route over time, reflecting the changes to the Hume Highway and the finish point has varied from Ashfield Town Hall 1902–1913; Enfield 1920–1922, 1924–1936; Merrylands 1923; Lidcombe 1937–1941 & 1946–1952; Sydney Sports Ground 1944; Wiley Park velodrome 1945; Bankstown 1959–1962; Liverpool 1974–1994; and Camden 1995–2012. The race was run in the reverse direction finishing at Goulburn and starting at Enfield in 1953–1958; Milperra 1963–1972 and Hoxton Park 1973

Records and Fast times 

In 1890 Captain Mark Long set the record for the then  in 18½ hours. There were a flurry of attempts in the early 20th century, with the successful attempts being Charlie Orr in 10hrs 38', P Allssoff 10hrs 28, C Melrose 10hr 22½', G E Green amateur record 11hrs 2' and Somerville 9hr 45'.

Littlechild, in winning the 1902 race, beat Graeme's 1896 race record to Ashfield and then continued on to the GPO in 8hrs 20' 30" to eclipse Sommerville's record.

The record to the Sydney GPO does not appear to have been broken since the 1930s, with the professional record being 6hrs 57' 56" set by Frankie Thomas in 1932 as part of his ride from Canberra to Sydney. The amateur record was last set at 5hrs 47' 4" in 1937 by Charles Winterbottom. Since 1937 any speed record attempt on public streets in NSW required the approval of the Commissioner of Police.

There have been so many changes to the road surface, road alignment, distance, direction and finishing location that trying to identify a race record is an exercise in semantics. The following however are some of the more notable times.
In the professional ranks, Don Kirkham's time of 6hr 19' to Ashfield in 1911 was not eclipsed until Percy Osborn's ride of 6hrs 2m 50s in 1927. Osborn's time of 5hrs 56' 40" to Enfield was the first race time under six hours. By 1935 the race time to Enfield was reduced to 5hrs 2' 31" by Joseph Buckley NSW and H P Veitch Victoria in a dead heat. The first to get under five hours was Kerry Hoole in 1965 from Milperra to Goulburn in the first of his four consecutive fastest times.

In the amateur ranks, Ern Pedersen's time of 6hr 24' 30" in 1913  was second only to Don Kirkham's professional time in 1911 and was not beaten until 1927 when Richard Lamb continued on to Ashfield. The first amateur under six hours was Edgar Johns in 1930 with a time of 5hrs 46' 10"  Just five years later Charles Winterbottom had lowered the race time to 5hrs 05' 13"  in the second of his three consecutive fastest times. The first amateur under five hours was David Watson in 1969 with a time of 4hrs 57' 20" for the Milperra to Goulburn route.

In the open era, Brett Dutton set the fastest time of 3hrs 40' 34" to Liverpool. With the Camden finish, including a lap of razorback, the fastest time was that of Richard Lang in 2009 in 3hrs 45' 31"

Women's race
Women did not compete in the Goulburn to Sydney prior to 1980. When women's races were run, they were over shorter distances, such as in 1947 there was a race Camden to Sydney, won by Miss J Whiteley and the fastest time was Mrs O Herd  Women did however set records on the course at the time of running the event, with Lillian Thorpe setting a time of 9hr 52' in 1932. Edna Sayers lowered the record to 7hr 41' 5" in 1933, and to 6hrs 11' 30" in 1935. In 1936 as part of her record-breaking ride from Canberra to Sydney, Edna Sayers set a new record for Goulburn to the Sydney GPO of 7hrs 43' 8". In 1980 two women from Canberra entered the amateur event, with Shaine Mulholland being reported as the first woman to finish the course. In 2000 there was a separate women's race, won by Nathalie Bates. In 2008 were able to enter the open event. Women wanting to enter the event needed to be graded C and above and needed specific approval as the race exceeded the UCI maximum distance for women. The first female was Oenone Wood who finished 43rd overall.

Winners by year
For details of second and third as well as the fastest time, see the lists maintained by Cycling NSW for Amateur and Open  and Professional.

References

Further reading 
 Goulburn to Sydney : A narrative of ninety years of a cycling classic 1902–1992 / by Jack Hepher and John Drummond

Photographs

 
 
 
 
 
 
 

Cycle races in Australia
Cycling in New South Wales (Australia)
Recurring sporting events established in 1902
Recurring sporting events disestablished in 2012
1902 establishments in Australia
2012 disestablishments in Australia